Vinaya Mariam John Fenn (born 29 April, 1994), better known as RJ Vinaya, is an Indian radio jockey. Having started her career with the Malayalam channel Radio Mango, she now works in the Alappuzha branch of the network and hosts the channel's daytime programming. Her most popular programme on Radio Mango is "Timepass". In addition to her voice career, Fenn has also acted in short films including Whatsapp in Real Life.

Early life
Vinaya Mariam John Fenn was born on April 29, 1994 in Kottayam, Kerala, to John and Sally Fenn.

References

Living people
Indian radio personalities
1994 births